Manono Airport  is an airport serving Manono, a city in Tanganyika Province, Democratic Republic of the Congo. The runway is within the city.

See also

Transport in the Democratic Republic of the Congo
List of airports in the Democratic Republic of the Congo

References

External links
 OpenStreetMap - Manono Airport
 OurAirports - Manono
 FallingRain - Manono Airport
 
 HERE Maps - Manono

Airports in Tanganyika Province